Carl J. Rinke (October 1, 1902 – February 11, 1979) was an American businessman and politician.

Rinke was born on a farm in Wheaton, Traverse County, Minnesota. He graduated from high school and then went to the West Central School of Agriculture (University of Minnesota Morris) in Morris, Minnesota. Rinke served in the United States Army, in the Signal Corps, during World War II. Rinke served in the Minnesota House of Representatives from 1947 to 1954.

References

1902 births
1978 deaths
People from Traverse County, Minnesota
Military personnel from Minnesota
Businesspeople from Minnesota
University of Minnesota Morris alumni
Members of the Minnesota House of Representatives